RKO refers to RKO Pictures, an American film company.

RKO may also refer to:


Organisations
RKO General, holding company for General Tire and Rubber Company up to 1981
RKO Radio Network, a subsidiary of RKO General
Rutten Komt Op, a football team of Rutten, Flevoland

Other
Reichskommissariat Ostland, Nazi-controlled Baltic territory in WWII
A wrestling jumping cutter used by Randy Orton as a finisher

See also
Rated-RKO, a former wrestling team